

Acts of the Northern Ireland Assembly

|-
| {{|Private Tenancies (Coronavirus Modifications) Act (Northern Ireland) 2020|ania|2|04-05-2020|maintained=y|archived=n|An Act to Make emergency modifications in connection with coronavirus in relation to notices to quit to be given by landlords of private tenancies.}}
|-
| {{|Budget (No. 2) Act (Northern Ireland) 2020|ania|3|17-06-2020|maintained=y|archived=n|An Act to authorise the issue out of the Consolidated Fund of a certain sum for the service of the year ending 31 March 2021; to appropriate that sum for specified purposes; to authorise the Department of Finance to borrow on the credit of that sum; and to authorise the use for the public service of certain resources for that year.}}
|-
| {{|Executive Committee (Functions) Act (Northern Ireland) 2020|ania|4|25-08-2020|maintained=y|archived=n|An Act to make provision concerning the decisions which may be made by Ministers without recourse to the Executive Committee.}}
|-
| {{|Housing (Amendment) Act (Northern Ireland) 2020|ania|5|28-08-2020|maintained=y|archived=n|An Act to amend the law relating to housing associations; and for connected purposes.}}
|-
| {{|Budget (No. 3) Act (Northern Ireland) 2020|ania|6|25-11-2020|maintained=y|archived=n|An Act to authorise the issue out of the Consolidated Fund of a certain sum for the service of the year ending 31 March 2021; to appropriate that sum for specified purposes; to authorise the Department of Finance to borrow on the credit of that sum; to authorise the use for the public service of certain resources (including accruing resources) for the year ending 31 March 2021; to authorise the issue out of the Consolidated Fund of an excess cash sum for the service of the year ending 31 March 2017; to authorise the use for the public service of excess resources for that year; and to repeal certain spent provisions.}}
}}

References

2020